Bradyll or Braddyll Can refer to:-

People
Wilson Gale-Braddyll
Colonel Thomas Bradyll - Owner of the South Hetton Colliery in the 1830s.

Transportation
Bradyll (locomotive) an early steam locomotive.